Hannah Lander, also known as Hernàn Lander, is a New York City based Dominican Republic fashion designer. Her designs have been featured in Model Latina and worn by celebrities such as Olivia Munn. She was selected as 2010's "Breakout Designer" by Time Out magazine.

Education
Lander attended Altos de Chavón design school in the Dominican Republic. She obtained a full scholarship to study at the Parsons The New School for Design in Manhattan.

Career
Lander worked for renown Mexican designer Rogelio Velasco during an internship at his design house, Velasco Couture. Lander has also collaborated with other designers including Derek Lam, Proenza Schouler, and Ralph Lauren.

In 2007 she was a finalist in the Gap Design competition and she also won the Nordstrom competition that same year. She produced and sold her collection from this competition.

After graduation from Parson she worked with Donna Karan, up to December 2008. She subsequently launched her self-titled contemporary line.

Lander was featured in the iFashion Network sponsored iFashion Week for their Spring 2010 show. This event is produced by iConcept Media Group; it forms part of the broader New York Fashion Week. She was later nominated by Time Out magazine as the "Breakout Designer" for 2010.

She appeared on the Mercedes-Benz sponsored New York Fashion Week's Fall 2013 show, held from February 7–14.

Lander was a contestant in the 13th season of the reality TV show Project Runway, placing 13th in the competition.

References

External links
 Hernan Lander Official page
 Hernan Lander on Twitter

Dominican Republic fashion designers
Living people
Year of birth missing (living people)